Louis Patrick James Partridge (born 3 June 2003) is an English actor and model. He is best known for his roles as Lord Tewkesbury in the Netflix films Enola Holmes (2020) and Enola Holmes 2 (2022), and Sid Vicious in the FX and Star miniseries Pistol (2022).

Early life 
Partridge was born on 3 June 2003 in Wandsworth, London. He is of Welsh descent on his mother's side. He has an older and a younger sister.

Partridge attended Dulwich Preparatory School. He played rugby with Battersea Ironsides Sports Club. He then went to secondary school at Alleyn's School, where he was a member of Tyson's House. He completed his A Levels in 2021 with A*s in French and English, and an A in Film Studies.

Career
Partridge made his acting debut in a 2014 short film Beneath Water. Partridge was one of the England mascots at the 2015 Rugby World Cup game against Wales, held at Twickenham Stadium.

Partridge initially gained recognition as Piero de Medici in Medici and appeared in Paddington 2. He rose to further prominence when he played Tewkesbury in Enola Holmes alongside Millie Bobby Brown and Henry Cavill. He reprised the role in the film's 2022 sequel. In 2019, he joined the cast of The Lost Girls, playing the immortal boy Peter Pan.

In January 2021, Partridge joined the cast of FX's Pistol as the titular band's bassist Sid Vicious. Later that year in October, he was cast in the epic fantasy romance Ferryman. Partridge then branched out to the thriller genre, joining the cast of Apple TV's Disclaimer in May 2022.

Filmography

Film

Television

See also
 Enola Holmes (film)

References

External links
 

Living people
2003 births
21st-century British actors
English male child actors
English male film actors
English male television actors
English people of Welsh descent
Male actors from London
People educated at Alleyn's School
People from the London Borough of Wandsworth